Double-sideband reduced carrier transmission (DSB-RC):  transmission in which (a) the frequencies produced by amplitude modulation are symmetrically spaced above and below the carrier and (b) the carrier level is reduced for transmission at a fixed level below that which is provided to the modulator. 

Note:  In DSB-RC transmission, the carrier is usually transmitted at a level suitable for use as a reference by the receiver, except for the case in which it is reduced to the minimum practical level, i.e. the carrier is suppressed.

See also
Double-sideband suppressed-carrier transmission

References

Radio modulation modes